John Blundell (9 October 1952 – 22 July 2014) was a British economist who served as Director General and the Ralph Harris Fellow at the Institute of Economic Affairs. Blundell had been involved in the creation and development of numerous free-market think tanks.

Early life
Born in Congleton, Cheshire, on 9 October 1952, he was educated at The King's School, Macclesfield, and at the London School of Economics.

Career
He headed the Press, Research and Parliamentary Liaison Office at the Federation of Small Businesses from 1977 to 1982, and was a Lambeth London Borough Councillor from 1978 to 1982. From 1982 to 1993 he was resident in the United States, where he was President of the Institute for Humane Studies (1988–1991), President of the Atlas Economic Research Foundation (1987–1991), President of the Board of the Congressional Schools of Virginia (1988–1992) and President of the Charles G. Koch and Claude R. Lambe Charitable Foundations (1991–1992).

Blundell became Director General of the Institute of Economic Affairs on 1 January 1993.

In addition he served as Co-founder and Chairman of the Institute for Children in Boston, Massachusetts (1993–1997); Founder and Director of the Institute for Justice in Washington D.C. (1991–1993); International Trustee of The Fraser Institute in Vancouver, British Columbia (1988–1993); and Founder Trustee of the Buckeye Institute in Ohio. 

Blundell was a Director of Fairbridge and of the International Policy Network, and Chairman of the Institute Development and Relations Committee on the board of Atlas Economic Research Foundation. He was also a board member of the Institute for Humane Studies at George Mason University in Fairfax, Virginia; of the Institute of Economic Studies in Paris, France; and, until 2012, of the Mont Pelerin Society.

Death
Blundell died on 22 July 2014 at the age of 61.

Works
Books
Female Force: Ayn Rand, with Todd Tennant and Jaymes Reed. Bluewater Productions, 2011. .
Government Failure, with Alan Peacock, Otmar Issing, Richard Allen Epstein, Carolyn Fairbairn, David B. Smith, Geoffrey Edward Wood, James Tooley and David Graham. London: Institute of Economic Affairs, 2003. .
Ladies For Liberty: Women Who Made a Difference in American History. Algora Publishing, 2011. .
Margaret Thatcher: A Portrait of the Iron Lady. Algora Publishing, 2008. .
Regulation Without the State: The Debate Continues, with Colin Robinson. London: Institute of Economic Affairs, 2000. .
Waging the War of Ideas. London: Institute of Economic Affairs, 2003. .

Articles
"Arthur Seldon CBE and the IEA". Liberty Fund, November 2013.
"IHS and the Rebirth of Austrian Economics: Some Reflections on 1974–1976". The Quarterly Journal of Austrian Economics, Vol. 17, No. 1, Spring 2014, pp. 92-107.

References

External links
 
 Video collection on NewMedia, Universidad Francisco Marroquín.
 Arthur Seldon, the Institute of Economic Affairs, and the Battle for Liberty in Britain.

1952 births
2014 deaths
People from Congleton
People educated at The King's School, Macclesfield
Alumni of the London School of Economics
British economists
Councillors in the London Borough of Lambeth
Austrian School economists